Lake Warren was a proglacial lake that formed in the Lake Erie basin around 12,700 years before present (YBP) when Lake Whittlesey dropped in elevation. Lake Warren is divided into three stages: Warren I , Warren II , and Warren III , each defined by the relative elevation above sea level.

Origin
Lake Warren followed Lake Wayne.  It covered the basin of Lake Erie, part of Lake Huron, including Saginaw Bay and the lowland, which separates Lake Huron from Lake Erie. It included a part of the Lake Ontario basin and the lowland between Lakes Ontario and Erie. 
Lake Warren included the Saginaw basin and the Huron-Erie basin. Its outlet was through the Grand River to Lake Chicago. Lake Warren was preceded by a lower stage, which had its outlet through the Mohawk valley.
Lake Warren came into existence its waters were raised from Lake Wayne by advancing ice front.  The ice both compacted the area where the melt water could be held, raising the water level, while blocking the lower outlet from Lake Wayne.

Size
Lake Warren was about half the size of the present day Lake Erie, lying in the southern half of the basin.

Beach
Between there and Batavia, New York, it rises  in the next .
The beach marks a lake level which lasted a considerable period of time, shorter than either the Arkona or the Lake Whittlesey durations. The delta deposits are not as extensive as Lake Arkona. Its shore deposits vary, where the lakebed was till or gravelly material, a gravelly beach was formed.  Where the lakebed was sandy it is a sandy ridge.

Lakes Warren and Wayne
These ridges occur at the foot of the Allegheny Plateau. They are frequently associated with deltas. The ridges are well developed in a few areas well beyond the Plateau in the Lakes Erie and Ontario lowlands. In many cases, the ridges and deltas are underlain by silts of Lake Whittlesey lakebed.

See also
Proglacial lakes of the Lake Erie Basin

Lake Maumee
Lake Arkona
Lake Wayne
Lake Whittlesey
Lake Warren

Lake Grassmere
Early Lake Algonquin
Lake Lundy and Dana
Early Lake Erie
Lake Erie

References

 Strand Lines and Chronology of the Glacial Great Lakes in Northwestern New York; Parker E. Calkin; Department of Geological Sciences, State University of New York at Buffalo; The Ohio Journal of Science 70(2): 78, March, 1970
 Chapter XIX, Glacial Lake Warren; Frank B. Taylor; Glacial Formations and Drainage Features Erie and Ohio Basins; Frank Leverett and Frank B. Taylor; Government Printing Office; Washington, D.C.; 1902; pg 741-757
 Moraines of the Maumee Lobe; Glacial Formations and Drainage Features of the Erie and Ohio Basins; Monograph XLI; Frank Leverett; Government Printing Office; Washington, D.C.; 1902
 Publication 9. Geological Series 7; Surface Geology and Agricultural Conditions of the Southern Peninsula of Michigan; Frank Leverett with a Chapter on Climate by C. F. Schneider;Michigan Geological and Biological Survey Lansing Michigan; 1911
Bull. Geol. Soo. America, vol. S, 1897, pp. 274–297; also vol. 10, 1899, pp. 27–68.
Mon. U. S. Geol. Survey, vol. 41, 1902, pp. 760–771.
Correlation of Erie-Huron beaches with outlets and moraines of southeastern Michigan: Bull. Geol. Soc. America, vol. S, 1897, pp. 56–57.

Former lakes of the United States
Geology of Ohio
Geology of Michigan
Geology of New York (state)
Geology of Pennsylvania
Geological history of the Great Lakes
Proglacial lakes
Lake Erie
Glacial lakes of the United States